The 1761 Irish general election1 was the first general election to the Irish House of Commons in over thirty years, with the previous general election having taken place in 1727. Despite few constituencies hosting electoral contests, the election was significant due to it taking place in a time of rising political awareness within the Irish public, with many being drawn to the cause of patriotism.

Background
Unlike England, which had passed the Triennial Acts in 1694, thereby requiring elections every 3 years (and following 1716 every 7 years), Ireland had passed no similar pieces of legislation. As a result, the only limit on a term of parliament was the life of the monarch. This did not mean that the Commons had the same membership between 1727 and 1761, and numerous vacancies had occurred over the years, which had in turn been filled through by-elections.

By the late 1750s the lack of frequent elections was becoming a contested issue, and the issue was taken up by the patriot opposition in the House of Commons. This had seen some success, and in November 1757 the Commons had voted unanimously for heads of a bill on the subject.

In October 1760 King George II died, thereby making a new election unavoidable. Adding to this was the fact that none of Britains Chief Undertakers in Ireland; the Earl of Shannon, Archbishoper George Stone, John Ponsonby, or any other members of the Privy Council, were willing to risk the electoral consequences that would ensue should it appear they were not taking a popular and patriotic stance.

Election
Despite being the first general election in over 30 years, and the fact that the period preceding the election had seen great debate over implementing changes to the electoral system so as to make elections more common, ultimately the election result was largely anticlimactic, with only 26 of Ireland's 150 constituencies actually witnessing any form of electoral contest. Of these 26 constituencies 9 were counties and 17 were boroughs.

There were several reasons for the low number of electoral contests. One issue was a sense of political apathy, whilst the other was that the immense costs of standing for election dissuaded individuals from standing.

Dates of election
At this period elections did not take place at the same time in every constituency. The returning officer in each county or parliamentary borough fixed the precise date (see hustings for details of the conduct of the elections).

Constituencies hosting contests
Counties
Antrim
Cavan
Boroughs
Dublin City

See also
List of parliaments of Ireland
MPs elected in the Irish general election, 1761

References

1761 in Ireland
1761 in politics
18th-century elections in Ireland
Elections in the Kingdom of Ireland